During 5–12 July 2013, warships from the Russian Pacific Fleet  and the North Sea Fleet of the People's Liberation Army Navy participated in Joint Sea 2013 (Chinese name), bilateral naval maneuvers held in the Peter the Great Gulf.  Naval Cooperation 2013 was the Russian name.  Joint Sea 2013 was the largest naval drills yet undertaken by China's navy with a foreign navy. The exercise involved anti-submarine warfare drills, close maneuvers, and the simulated seizure of a hostile ship.

"Joint Sea" maneuvers continued after 2013.

Naval forces

Other forces included three planes, five ship-based helicopters, and two teams of special forces.

References 

2013 in Russia
Military exercises and wargames
People's Liberation Army Navy
Russian Navy
2013 in China
Sea of Japan